Nukem GmbH, together with its subsidiary Nukem Inc., markets nuclear fuel components and speciality products utilities worldwide. Since the 1970s, Nukem has transitioned from playing a modest role in uranium brokerage to becoming one of the world's largest intermediaries in the international nuclear fuel market.

History
Nukem was established in 1960 by Degussa, Rio Tinto and Mallinckrodt.  In 1965, RWE acquired 25% of shares.

Effective April 1, 2006, the private equity firm Advent International has taken over Nukem.

In 2007, Nukem sold its subsidiaries NUKEM Ltd. to Freyssinet SAS, NUKEM Corp. to EnergySolutions, NIS Ingenieure and Assistance Nucleaire S.A. to Siempelkamp.  On 14 December 2009, Nukem sold its subsidiary Nukem Technologies, which is dealing with nuclear power plant decommissioning, waste management and engineering services, to Russian Atomstroyexport for €23.5 million.

In 2012, the company was acquired by Cameco.

Operations
The company markets nuclear fuel components to utilities in North and South America, Western Europe and the Far East.

References

External links

 

Companies based in Bavaria
Nuclear fuel companies
Nuclear power companies of Germany